Beaverdam Creek is a stream in Georgia, and is a tributary of the Soque River.

Course

The creek then crosses State Route 17/115, and flows into the Soque River just west of Clarkesville, and just north of Habersham Mills Lake.

Sub-watershed details

See also
Water Resource Region
South Atlantic-Gulf Water Resource Region
Apalachicola basin

References

External links
Soque River Watershed Association

Rivers of Georgia (U.S. state)
Rivers of Habersham County, Georgia